Eric Kyalo Mutua (born 1970) is a Kenyan lawyer and politician. He has served as the chairman of the Law Society of Kenya and as the treasurer of the East Africa Law Society He unsuccessfully contested for Mwingi Central constituency Wiper Democratic Movement-Kenya (WDM-K) nominations where he lost to Gideon Mulyungi, the incumbent Member of Parliament.

References 

1970 births
Living people
Kamba people
21st-century Kenyan lawyers
People from Kitui County